W. Edwards was a footballer for Crewe Alexandra and Burslem Port Vale.

Career
Edwards played for Crewe Alexandra before joining Burslem Port Vale in August 1904. His only recorded game was a 2–0 win over Doncaster Rovers at the Athletic Ground on 18 March 1905. He was released at the end of the 1905–06 season.

Career statistics
Source:

References

Year of birth missing
Year of death missing
English footballers
Association football forwards
Crewe Alexandra F.C. players
Port Vale F.C. players
English Football League players